The canton of Courtenay is an administrative division of the Loiret department, central France. Its borders were modified at the French canton reorganisation which came into effect in March 2015. Its seat is in Courtenay.

It consists of the following communes:
 
Bazoches-sur-le-Betz
Le Bignon-Mirabeau
Chantecoq
La Chapelle-Saint-Sépulcre
Château-Renard
Chevannes
Chevry-sous-le-Bignon
Chuelles
Corbeilles
Courtemaux
Courtempierre
Courtenay
Dordives
Douchy-Montcorbon
Ervauville
Ferrières-en-Gâtinais
Fontenay-sur-Loing
Foucherolles
Girolles
Gondreville
Griselles
Gy-les-Nonains
Louzouer
Melleroy
Mérinville
Mignères
Mignerette
Nargis
Pers-en-Gâtinais
Préfontaines
Rozoy-le-Vieil
Saint-Firmin-des-Bois
Saint-Germain-des-Prés
Saint-Hilaire-les-Andrésis
Sceaux-du-Gâtinais
La Selle-en-Hermoy
La Selle-sur-le-Bied
Thorailles
Treilles-en-Gâtinais
Triguères
Villevoques

References

Cantons of Loiret